Wolfmother is the debut studio album by Australian rock band Wolfmother, originally released on 31 October 2005 in Australia. The album was later released internationally at various dates in 2006, with the addition of "Love Train" and a rearranged track listing. Wolfmother peaked at number three on the Australian ARIA Albums Chart and was certified five times platinum by the Australian Recording Industry Association. Six singles were released from Wolfmother's debut album: "Mind's Eye" (with "Woman"), "White Unicorn", "Dimension", "Woman", "Love Train" and "Joker & the Thief", the latter of which charted the highest at number eight on the ARIA Singles Chart. The album cover, which is taken from The Sea Witch by Frank Frazetta, shows a nymph standing against a blue/orange sky, on a rock, though because it displays nudity the album is sold in Wal-Mart stores with an alternate cover featuring simply the band's white logo against a black background. It is the only album to feature co-founding members Chris Ross and Myles Heskett, who left the band in August 2008.

At the J Award of 2005, the album won Australian Album of the Year.

Release and reception

Wolfmother was first issued in Australia on 30 October 2005 through Modular Recordings. Prior to its release it was played on high rotation on radio station Triple J, and as a result was the featured album of the week starting 28 October, won both the inaugural J Award and the listener's choice Album of the Year. It also contributed a record total of six songs to the Hottest 100 chart, of which the highest was "Mind's Eye" at  6. By 2007, the album had been certified five times platinum and had peaked at No. 3.

For the international release of the album, the track listing was tweaked slightly and "Love Train", previously released as the B-side to "White Unicorn", was added. It was not as well received in the UK and the US as in Australia, though Wolfmother still managed to reach No. 25 and No. 22 respectively. By 2007 it had also been certified gold by the British Phonographic Industry, the Recording Industry Association of America and the Canadian Recording Industry Association.

Upon its release, Wolfmother received mainly positive reviews from critics. It was named 15th greatest album of 2006 by Rolling Stone magazine. The album's sound was compared to such 1960s and 1970s hard rock and heavy metal bands as Led Zeppelin and Black Sabbath, as well as more modern bands including Queens of the Stone Age and The White Stripes, though this led some reviewers to go as far as accusing the trio of "ripping off" such bands. Q were somewhat less critical, describing the music as "Far from rocket science, but immense fun nonetheless". Total Guitar gave the album 9/10, describing it as "ruddy marvellous", adding that it "can't fail to bowl you over". The Record Review also praised the band and its debut, remarking that if they "continue to produce such epic songs and memorable riffs, there’s no doubt they will be at the forefront of rock and roll for years to come."

Following the release of the debut, Yahoo! critic Rob O'Connor noted them as number 15 on his list of 'The Greatest Australian Acts' on his 'List of the Day' blog. Furthermore, he compared their sound to be more reminiscent of psychedelic rock bands like Blue Cheer, Toe Fat Revival, Bloodrock and Frijid Pink, rather than comparing them to straight forward hard rock bands like Black Sabbath.
Lars Ulrich of Metallica fame has gone on record as a huge fan of the debut, noting their debut to be "awesome", and that following its release, he would listen to it "every day". In 2009, the song "Vagabond" was used in the movie 500 Days of Summer. The song "Apple Tree" was used in the trailer for The Hangover Part III. The song "Dimension" was used in season 3, episode 16 of House.
Dimension was also used in the soundtrack of the game FlatOut 2

The album has sold over one million copies worldwide.

Track listings
All songs written and composed by Andrew Stockdale, Chris Ross and Myles Heskett.

Personnel

Wolfmother
Andrew Stockdale – vocals, guitar
Chris Ross – bass, keyboards
Myles Heskett – drums
Guest musicians
Lenny Castro – percussion on "Apple Tree", "Witchcraft" and "Love Train"
Dan Higgins – flute on "Witchcraft"

Additional personnel
Dave Sardy – production, mixing, percussion on "Colossal", "Where Eagles Have Been", "Vagabond" and "Love Train"
Ryan Castle – engineering
Stephen Marcussen – mastering
Andy Brohard – digital editing, assistant engineering, Pro Tools editing
Cameron Barton – assistant engineering
Pete Martinez – assistant engineering
Frank Frazetta – cover painting

Charts

Weekly charts

Decade-end charts

Certifications

Release history

References

Wolfmother albums
2005 debut albums
Albums produced by Dave Sardy
ARIA Award-winning albums
Modular Recordings albums
Albums with cover art by Frank Frazetta
Albums recorded at Sound City Studios